Đinh Xuân Tửu (2 February 1925 – 5 November 1996) was a Vietnamese writer and poet (pen-names: Văn Lâm, Kỳ Phong, Thành Lễ, Tô Huyền An). He was born in Hà Tĩnh Province, Vietnam. He was a poet loved by children, one of the founders of the Kim Đồng Publishing House, and a member of the Vietnam Writers' Association (1957).

Works

His first work was the poem "Nhớ tình cũ" published in Tràng An newspaper – Huế city (1940). Following are some works stored in Vietnam National Library, among them most known are: Em vẫn là em;  Ông Đồ Nghệ.

 Làng vui (1955)
 Em vẽ hình chữ S : NXB Kim Đồng, 1957; 27pg ; 24 cm
 Vợ chồng lửa và nước : Translated ; NXB Kim Đồng, 1958 ; 20pg ; 19 cm
 Tarat Bunba : Translated ;  NXB Văn hoá, 1959 ; 160pg ; 19 cm
 2nd Edition: NXB Văn học, 1966; 191pg;15 cm ;
 3rd Edition: NXB Văn học, 2000; 200pg ; 19 cm
 Kinh nghiệm viết cho các em : NXB Văn học, 1960; 116pg ; 19 cm
 Về thăm quê : NXB Phổ thông, 1957; 21pg ; 19 cm
 Tiếng chuông ngân : NXB Phổ thông, 1960; 20pg ; 19 cm
 Quê hương : Ty văn hoá Hà Tĩnh, 1961; 39pg ; 19 cm
 Dũng sĩ Ec - Quyn : NXB Kim Đồng, 1961; 95pg; 30 cm
 Thời niên thiếu của bút chì : NXB Kim Đồng, 1961, 35pg; 19 cm
 Đôi bạn : Ty văn hoá Hà Tĩnh, 1961; 15pg ; 19 cm
 Đội trưởng đội chiếu bóng 59 : NXB Văn hoá nghệ thuật, 1962; 101pg ; 19 cm
 Mác, Ănghen, Lênin và văn học, nghệ thuật : Translated ; NXB Sự thật, 1962; 210pg ; 19 cm
 Đứa con : NXB Kim Đồng, 1963; 64pg; 19 cm
 Chắp cánh cho chim :  NXB Kim Đồng, 1965; 44pg ; 19 cm
 Nhân dân với cách mạng :  NXB Phổ thông, 1966; 79pg ; 19 cm
 Kể chuyện Bác Hồ (truyện, 1965)
 Tấm lòng người mẹ : NXB Kim Đồng, 1973; 39pg ; 19 cm
 Nắng thu : Ty văn hoá Thái Bình, 1970
 Trang sách trung thu: NXB Kim Đồng, 1970; 50pg ; 19 cm
 Văn học và trẻ em : Translated ; NXB Kim Đồng, 1982; 102pg ; 19 cm
 Những kỷ niệm đẹp : NXB Nghệ Tĩnh, 1983; 72pg ; 19 cm
 Nhóm năm người và kho vàng trên đảo : Translated from Enid Blyton ; NXB Cửu Long, 1986; 198pg ; 19 cm
 Em vẫn là em : NXB Kim Đồng, 1990; 28pg; 19 cm
 Nghệ thuật yêu thương: Translated, 1994
 Anh chàng Tây Ban Nha : Translated ;  NXB Văn học, 1994; 485pg ; 19 cm
 Ông đồ Nghệ : NXB. Hội nhà văn, 1997; 123pg ; 19 cm
 Thơ văn Xuân Tửu: NXB Hội nhà văn, 2006, 720 pg, 20,5 cm

References 

Vietnamese writers
Vietnamese male poets
1925 births
1996 deaths
20th-century Vietnamese poets
20th-century male writers